The Europe/Africa Zone was one of the three zones of the regional Davis Cup competition in 1991.

In the Europe/Africa Zone there were two different tiers, called groups, in which teams competed against each other to advance to the upper tier.

Group I

Winners in Group I advanced to the World Group Qualifying Round, along with losing teams from the World Group first round. Teams who lost in the first round competed in the relegation play-offs, with winning teams remaining in Group I, whereas teams who lost their play-offs were relegated to the Europe/Africa Zone Group IIs in 1992.

Participating nations

Draw

Group II Europe

The winner in the Europe Zone Group II advanced to the Europe/Africa Zone Group I in 1992.

Participating nations

Draw

  promoted to Group I in 1992.

Group II Africa

The winner in the Africa Zone Group II advanced to the Europe/Africa Zone Group I in 1992.

Participating nations

Draw

  promoted to Group I in 1992.

External links
Davis Cup official website

Davis Cup Europe/Africa Zone
Europe Africa Zone